Jagdeo may refer to:

Jagdeo, Pakistan, village in Punjab, Pakistan
Bharrat Jagdeo, Guyanese President